Thomas Sykora (born 18 May 1968) is a former alpine skier from Austria.

Biography
Thomas comes from a sporting family: his father Ernst Sykora was a ski instructor, and his aunts Liese Prokop and Maria Sykora were both successful athletes. He competed at the 1994 Winter Olympics and the 1998 Winter Olympics, winning a bronze medal at the latter.

Sykora won the 1996/97 and 1997/98 Slalom World Cups.
Before winning these 2 World Cups, he finished second of the competition in 1994 in  Lech. After finishing first in the first round, he eventually was beaten by Alberto Tomba by 2 hundredths of a second after the second round.
In total, Thomas won nine World Cup races. At the  Olympic Games 1998 in Nagano, he won the bronze medal in slalom. In 1996 and 1999 he also became Austrian slalom champion.

After numerous knee injuries, Thomas Sykora was forced to quit his career and became an  ORF commentator. He started commenting on women's races in 2000. Later, he served as commentator in important men's slaloms (Kitzbühel, Schladming). On most of the races he comments, Thomas wears a helmet with a camera to show the spectators the different routes of the slalom, and their difficulties.

After the end of his active career as an athlete, he decided to study mental coaching in Bregenz; he then graduated with an MBA.

World Cup victories

Overall results

Individual victories

References

External links
 

1968 births
Living people
Austrian male alpine skiers
Alpine skiers at the 1994 Winter Olympics
Alpine skiers at the 1998 Winter Olympics
Olympic alpine skiers of Austria
Olympic medalists in alpine skiing
FIS Alpine Ski World Cup champions
Medalists at the 1998 Winter Olympics
Olympic bronze medalists for Austria
People from Tulln an der Donau